Roslinda Samsu (born 9 June 1982 in Padang Terap) is a Malaysian pole vaulter. She is a four-time defending champion at the Southeast Asian Games, and a silver medalist at the 2006 Asian Games in Doha, Qatar. She won the bronze medal at the 2005 Asian Athletics Championships in Incheon, South Korea, but nearly missed out of the podium at the 2006 Commonwealth Games in Melbourne, Australia. She was also able to clear her personal best of 4.20 metres to capture the gold medal at the 2007 Asian Athletics Championships in Amman, Jordan.

Roslinda represented Malaysia the 2008 Summer Olympics in Beijing, after reaching a qualifying mark of 4.30 metres in both the indoor and outdoor meets. She competed in the women's pole vault, an event which was prominently dominated by Russia's Yelena Isinbayeva. Roslinda cleared the bar in the preliminary rounds, with her seasonal best distance of 4.30 metres, tying her position with Australia's Alana Boyd, in eighth place for the group, and in sixteenth overall.

Competition record

References

External links

NBC 2008 Olympics profile

Malaysian pole vaulters
Female pole vaulters
Living people
Olympic athletes of Malaysia
Athletes (track and field) at the 2008 Summer Olympics
People from Kedah
1982 births
Asian Games medalists in athletics (track and field)
Athletes (track and field) at the 2006 Asian Games
Athletes (track and field) at the 2010 Asian Games
World Athletics Championships athletes for Malaysia
Asian Games silver medalists for Malaysia
Malaysian female athletes
Medalists at the 2006 Asian Games
Athletes (track and field) at the 2006 Commonwealth Games
Athletes (track and field) at the 2010 Commonwealth Games
Commonwealth Games competitors for Malaysia
Southeast Asian Games medalists in athletics
Southeast Asian Games gold medalists for Malaysia
Competitors at the 2001 Southeast Asian Games
Competitors at the 2003 Southeast Asian Games
Competitors at the 2005 Southeast Asian Games
Competitors at the 2007 Southeast Asian Games
Competitors at the 2009 Southeast Asian Games
Competitors at the 2011 Southeast Asian Games